Joshua Sunday, professionally known as De General, is a Nigerian comedian and a content creator. He once disguised as a mad man so as to give back to the community by donating some amount of money to anyone who can help him.

Career 
The comedian earns from creating content on Facebook and YouTube. He considers Jackie Chan a role model as he is a martial fighter who uses comic ways to act.

Controversy 
De General was arrested by the National Drug Law Enforcement Agency (NDLEA) for allegedly involving in drugs and detained in their custody for a week. He was convicted at the Federal high court by Justice Daniel Osiagor, the judge confirmed that only minute amount was found hence he was only cautioned and not sentenced.

After release, De General cleared the air by accepting that although tramadol and Cannabis were found at his residence, He is not into drug trafficking aside from comedy.

The drug scandal was met by the public, fans and other celebrities in a bad reaction. One of those who reacted was BasketMouth who felt it was a waste of tax money. Also, Human Rights Writers Association of Nigeria (HURIWA) Condemn the parade of the comedian by NDLEA while sparing Abba Kyari who is a narcotic suspect as at the time of incidence. Mr. Macaroni also condemned the way De General was treated during the arrest.

References

Nigerian comedians
Living people
Nigerian YouTubers
Year of birth missing (living people)